Jeremy Wooding is a British film director, producer and writer; he also directs for television. He is best known for his work on Burning Men, Blood Moon and Bollywood Queen.

Selected filmography 
 Bollywood Queen (2002)
 Peep Show (2003)
 Dani's House (2008)
 The Magnificent Eleven (2013)
 Blood Moon (2014)
 Burning Men (2019)

References

External links 

20th-century births
Living people
Date of birth missing (living people)
English film directors
English film producers
English screenwriters
English male screenwriters
English television directors
Place of birth missing (living people)
1969 births